The 1941 Holy Cross Crusaders football team was an American football team represented the College of the Holy Cross as an independent during the 1941 college football season.  In its third and final season under head coach Joe Sheeketski, the team compiled a 4–4–2 record and was outscored by a total of 104 to 103. The team played its home games at Fitton Field in Worcester, Massachusetts.

Two Holy Cross players were selected by the United Press as first-team players on the 1941 All-New England football team: quarterback Francis L. Saba and fullback John Grigas.

Schedule

References

Holy Cross
Holy Cross Crusaders football seasons
Holy Cross Crusaders football